Carl Jönsson (1870–1949) was a German stage actor. He also appeared in films during the 1920s and 1930s.

Selected filmography
 Friedrich Schiller (1923)
 The Enchantress (1924)
 The Love Trap (1925)
 Three Days of Love (1931)
 The Girl from the Marsh Croft (1935)
 Trouble Backstairs (1935)
 The Young Count (1935)
 Lady Windermere's Fan (1935)
 My Son the Minister (1937)
 Robert Koch (1939)
 Sensationsprozess Casilla (1939)

References

Bibliography 
 Hans-Michael Bock & Michael Töteberg. Das Ufa-Buch. Zweitausendeins, 1992.

External links 
 

1870 births
1949 deaths
Male actors from Hamburg
German male film actors
German male stage actors